Oceanco's  Cloud 9 was delivered in 2015 as Infinity. Her exterior design is the work of Espen Øino and her interior is by Sinot Exclusive Yacht Design and David Kleinberg Design Associates. The Master Suite includes a private exterior deck and whirlpool. Guest accommodations consist of two VIP suites and four spacious guest staterooms.

She was sold by her first owner, Eric Smidt, to her new owner, Brett Blundy, in 2022 in anticipation of the delivery of a new  Oceanco built Infinity.

Specifications

 Length Overall: 
 Beam Overall: 
 Delivered: 2015
 Classification: Lloyd's Register ✠ 100 A1 SSC Yacht (P) MONO G6 ✠ LMC UMS MCA
 Maximum speed: 
 Accommodation: Master suite with private exterior deck and whirlpool, 2 VIP suites and 4 guest cabins
 Material: Steel hull & Aluminium superstructure 
 Engine type: 2 × MTU - 20V 4000 M73L - 
 Fuel capacity: 280,000 L / 73,968 US gallons
 Naval architect: Oceanco / Azure
 Exterior designer: Espen Øino
 Interior designer: Sinot Exclusive Yacht Design and David Kleinberg Design Associates

 See also 
 Motor yacht List of motor yachts by length List of yachts built by Oceanco Oceanco''

References

2014 ships
Motor yachts
Ships built in the Netherlands